Human movement may refer to:
 Humanism
 Sports science
 Individual mobility
 Human migration

See also
 Human
 Movement (disambiguation)